Llandysiliogogo is a community in the county of Ceredigion, Wales, and includes the villages of Caerwedros, Plwmp, and Talgarreg, and the hamlets of Blaenbedw Fawr, Crugyreryr, Bwlchyfadfa, Dolgerdd, Hafodiwan, Llwyndafydd, and Penbontrhydyfoethau. It lies 70 miles (113 km) north-west of Cardiff and 187 miles (301 km) from London.

In 2011 the population of Llandysiliogogo was 1131 with 53.4% of them able to speak Welsh.

There are a number of Celtic round barrows in the community dating back to the Iron Age.

References

See also
List of localities in Wales by population

Communities in Ceredigion